Manuel Wright (born April 13, 1984) is a former American football defensive tackle. He was drafted by the Miami Dolphins in the fifth round of the 2005 supplemental draft. Wright was also briefly signed to the Buffalo Bills and played for the New York Giants where he earned a Super Bowl ring in Super Bowl XLll.

Early years
Wright earned various team, local and national honors as a member of the football team at Long Beach Polytechnic High School in Long Beach, California. As a junior in 2000, Wright recorded 95 tackles (57 solo) and with 25 sacks. As a senior, Wright was the team's defensive MVP after recording 142 tackles (60 solo), 16 sacks, four fumble recoveries, three forced fumbles, 20 deflections and an interception.

College career
Wright originally signed with USC in 2002 but did not qualify for admission, so he attended Long Beach City College that season as a part-time student. However, he did not play football there.

In 2003, Wright served as a backup for Defensive tackles Shaun Cody and Mike Patterson. While appearing in nine games during the season, Wright recorded eight tackles, including two for losses and three pass deflections. His first career sack came against Michigan in the Rose Bowl.

Wright remained a backup to both Cody and Patterson as a sophomore in 2004. He appeared in 11 games including two starts when Cody was moved to Defensive end. On the year Wright had 23 tackles, including six for losses, two pass deflections and two fumble recoveries. For his efforts, he was an All-Pac-10 honorable mention.

Early departure
In 2005 Wright was a projected starter for the first time in his career, however, he sat out spring practices in order to work on his academics and remain eligible. However, he was unsuccessful, and was left with the options of either staying in school and not playing football or declaring for the NFL's supplemental draft, which is held by the league to accommodate players who did not enter the regular draft. Wright chose the latter.

Professional career

Miami Dolphins
Leading up to the supplemental draft, many NFL teams showed interest in Wright in the form of visits, workouts and interviews. The Miami Dolphins selected Wright in the fifth round of the draft, which essentially replaced their fifth-round pick in the 2006 draft. On July 22, Wright signed a four-year contract with the team. It included a signing bonus of $190,000.

Wright endured injuries and battled weight issues during his first training camp while his work ethic and maturity were questioned by some. In a much publicized incident on July 26, Wright broke down in tears during practice after being scolded by head coach Nick Saban.

As a rookie, Wright was active for three games during the season. He made his NFL debut on December 4 against the Buffalo Bills, stepping in for injured Nose tackle Keith Traylor. Wright recorded two tackles and a sack. He finished the season with four tackles, one sack and one pass deflected.

Wright reportedly gained 28 pounds during the 2006 offseason, but lost most of the weight during training camp. On August 8, a reportedly depressed Wright took a leave of absence from the team. He was quoted as saying he "did not believe he would ever play for the Dolphins again and that he needed a 'fresh start'".

Despite requests from his family and from Head coach Nick Saban, Wright remained away from football in 2006. The Dolphins attempted to trade him, unsuccessfully, but were unable to reach an agreement to release him. The team received a roster exemption for Wright in 2006 and he was placed on the non-football injury list.

Although Wright had returned to the team during the 2007 offseason under new head coach Cam Cameron, he was released on May 1.

Buffalo Bills
On May 3, the Buffalo Bills claimed Wright on waivers. Less than a week later, he was waived by the Bills. He told Chris Brown of the team's official website that he had 30 pounds to lose. Wright was subsequently cut by the Bills on May 10 after showing up at the team's first minicamp overweight.

New York Giants
Wright signed with the New York Giants on August 15, 2007. He appeared in six games during the regular season and recorded two tackles. He was also a member of the Giants' Super Bowl XLII championship team.

On April 10, 2008, the Giants waived Wright.

af2
In 2008 Wright joined the af2 and on December 22 was assigned to the Stockton Lightning. However, on May 8, he was suspended by the team.

See also
 List of University of Southern California people
 List of New York Giants players
 List of Miami Dolphins players
 List of National Football League and Arena football players

References

External links
 Stockton Lightning bio
 USC Trojans bio
Just Sports Stats

Players of American football from Compton, California
African-American players of American football
American football defensive tackles
USC Trojans football players
Miami Dolphins players
Buffalo Bills players
New York Giants players
Stockton Lightning players
1984 births
Living people
Las Vegas Locomotives players
Utah Blaze players
21st-century African-American sportspeople
20th-century African-American people
Long Beach Polytechnic High School alumni